Mains electricity by country includes a list of countries and territories, with the plugs, voltages and frequencies they commonly use for providing electrical power to low voltage appliances, equipment, and lighting typically found in homes and offices. (For industrial machinery, see industrial and multiphase power plugs and sockets.) Some countries have more than one voltage available. For example, in North America the supply to most premises is split-phase, with 240 volts between phases and 120 volts between either phase and neutral. Most sockets are connected to 120 V and neutral. By connecting across the phases, 240 V is available for large appliances. Often different sockets are mandated for different voltage or current levels.

Voltage, frequency, and plug type vary, but large regions may use common standards. Physical compatibility of receptacles may not ensure compatibility of voltage, frequency, or connection to earth (ground), including plugs and cords. In some areas, older standards may still exist. Foreign enclaves, extraterritorial government installations, or buildings frequented by tourists may support plugs not otherwise used in a country, for the convenience of travellers.

Main reference sourceIEC World Plugs

The International Electrotechnical Commission (IEC) publishes a web microsite World Plugs which provides the main source for this page, except where other sources are indicated. World Plugs includes some history, a description of plug types, and a list of countries giving the type(s) used and the mains voltage and frequency.
 
Although useful for quick reference, especially for travellers, IEC World Plugs may not be regarded as totally accurate, as illustrated by the examples in the plugs section below, and errors may exist, such as Indonesia being listed as using both 220 V and 110 V when the Indonesian Standard SPLN 1 clearly states the voltage as 230 V, and the official travel website says "electric power supply is 220 volts in all regions."

Voltages

Voltages in this article are the nominal single-phase supply voltages, or split-phase supply voltages. Three-phase and industrial loads may have other voltages.

Plugs

The system of plug types using a single letter (from A to N) used here is from World Plugs, which defines the plug type letters in terms of a general description, without making reference to specific standards. Where a plug does not have a specific letter code assigned to it, then it may be defined by the style sheet number listed in IEC TR 60083.  Not all plugs are included in the letter system; for example, there is no designation for the plugs defined by the Thai National Standard TIS 116-2549, though some web sites refer to the three-pin plug described in that standard as "Type O".

Identification guide

Table of mains voltages, frequencies, and plugs

See also

 Delta-wye transformer
 Electrical wiring
 Electric power transmission
 Electrification
 Electrical grid
 List of railway electrification systems
 Mains electricity

References

External links
 
 

Electricity
Electric power
Mains
Electrical standards
Electrical wiring
Elect
Mains power connectors

fi:Verkkovirta
ur:مینز برق بلحاظ ملک